The winnow algorithm is a technique from machine learning for learning a linear classifier from labeled examples.  It is very similar to the perceptron algorithm.  However, the perceptron algorithm uses an additive weight-update scheme, while Winnow uses a multiplicative scheme that allows it to perform much better when many dimensions are irrelevant (hence its name winnow). It is a simple algorithm that scales well to high-dimensional data. During training, Winnow is shown a sequence of positive and negative examples. From these it learns a decision hyperplane that can then be used to label novel examples as positive or negative.  The algorithm can also be used in the online learning setting, where the learning and the classification phase are not clearly separated.

Algorithm

The basic algorithm, Winnow1, is as follows. When the learner is given an example , it applies the typical prediction rule for linear classifiers:

 If , then predict 1
 Otherwise predict 0

Here  is a real number that is called the threshold.  Together with the weights, the threshold defines a dividing hyperplane in the instance space.  Good bounds are obtained if  (see below).

For each example with which it is presented, the learner applies the following update rule:

 If an example is correctly classified, do nothing.
 If an example is predicted incorrectly and the correct result was 0, for each feature , the corresponding weight  is set to 0 (demotion step).
 
 If an example is predicted incorrectly and the correct result was 1, for each feature , the corresponding weight  multiplied by (promotion step).
 

There are many variations to this basic approach.  Winnow2 is similar except that in the demotion step the weights are divided by  instead of being set to 0.  Balanced Winnow maintains two sets of weights, and thus two hyperplanes.  This can then be generalized for multi-label classification.

Mistake bounds
In certain circumstances, it can be shown that the number of mistakes Winnow makes as it learns has an upper bound that is independent of the number of instances with which it is presented.
.

References

Classification algorithms